Daniel Martin Shea is an American record producer and composer who has worked with numerous artists including Mariah Carey, Celine Dion, Jennifer Lopez, Janet Jackson, Santana, Barbra Streisand, Jessica Simpson. Sara Evans, Rob Thomas, Marc Anthony, Boyz II Men, Martina McBride, Kenny G, Ricky Martin, Bono, Mary J. Blige, R. Kelly, Robin Thicke, Toni Braxton, Babyface, Natalie Cole, Phil Collins, Luther Vandross, Michael Bolton, Lady Antebellum, Jim Brickman, Plácido Domingo, Grover Washington Jr., Al Jarreau, Kenny Loggins, Dusty Springfield, Daryl Hall, Boney James, New Kids on the Block, Rissi Palmer, Christina Milian, Jordan Pruitt, Thalía, Savage Garden, Clarence Clemons, and more.  As producer, composer, and multi-instrumentalist, Dan Shea's albums have sold over 150 million copies worldwide.

Dan Shea biography
Daniel Martin Shea was born in Chicago, Illinois, and is a multi-instrumentalist who plays piano, guitar, bass and drums. He toured with Mariah Carey for several years as keyboardist and has also appeared in numerous television performances and videos, including three Grammy shows, with Carey, Celine Dion, Santana, Jessica Simpson, Boyz II Men, and more. After working on a number of high-profile records, Shea was approached by Sony Records CEO Tommy Mottola and signed to both production and publishing deals. He soon began working closely with Motolla and producer Cory Rooney on projects including Jennifer Lopez, Marc Anthony Mended and Jessica Simpson I Think I'm in Love with You. Shea has also collaborated with other top producers including David Foster, Walter Afanasieff, Rodney Jerkins, and Keith Thomas. Mostly Afanasieff, he has collaborated with him as a staff producer from 1991 to 1999.

Shea has been successful in several genres besides pop and R&B.  He has produced records for country artists including Martina McBride, Sara Evans, Lady Antebellum, Colin Raye and Rissi Palmer (Palmer's song, "Country Girl", co-written with Shea, marks the first time an African-American female has been on Billboard's Hot Country chart in over twenty years.)

Shea has also worked with Smooth Jazz artists including Kenny G (Kenny G - Greatest Hits), Al Jarreau, Grover Washington Jr., Jim Brickman, and Boney James.

He was also an instrumental part of the "Latin Explosion" in popular music with his production on records by Ricky Martin, Jennifer Lopez, Marc Anthony, and Thalía.

External links
DanSheaProductions website
Dan Shea at artistdirect.com

Dan Shea album/song credits

Mariah Carey
MTV Unplugged
Merry Christmas
DayDream
Butterfly
1's

Celine Dion
Celine Dion
Let's Talk About Love
Titanic Soundtrack
Beauty and The Beast Soundtrack
All The Way: A Decade Of Song

Jennifer Lopez
On The 6
JLo
J to the Lo
This Is Me... Then
The Reel Me

Janet Jackson
20YO

Santana
Shaman

Jessica Simpson
Sweet Kisses
A Public Affair

Sara Evans
Never Alone

Martina McBride
Valentine

Marc Anthony
Marc Anthony
Mended

Orla Fallon
Distant Shore

Mariah Carey (w Boyz II Men)
One Sweet Day

Kenny G
Breathless
Greatest Hits
My Heart Will Go On
The Essential Kenny G
Best

Ricky Martin
Ricky Martin

Kirk Franklin (with R. Kelly and Mary J Blige)
Lean On Me

Toni Braxton
Libra

Luther Vandroos
Songs

Jim Brickman
Picture This
The Gift
Escape

Plácido Domingo
Ave Maria

Michael Bolton
This Is The Time
All That Matters
Joy To The World
Merry Christmas From Vienna

Grover Washington Jr.
Soulful Strut

Lady Antebellum
Never Alone

Rissi Palmer
Rissi Palmer

Barbra Streisand
Higher Ground

Daryl Hall
Can’t Stop Dreamin’

Kenny Loggins
The Unimaginable Life
Starbright

Al Jarreau
Tomorrow Today

Ruff Endz
Someone To Love You

Ginuwine
The Life

Colin Raye
Greatest Hits

Thalía
El Sexto Sentido
Arrasando

Mandy Moore
I Wanna Be With You

Boney James
Sweet Thing
Funky Xmas

Phil Collins
Why Can't It Wait Til Morning

Tom Jones/Paul Anka
A Body Of Work

New Kids On The Block
FaceThe Music

Jordan Pruitt
No Ordinary Girl

BabyFace
Babyface Christmas

Peabo Bryson
Alladin Soundtrack
Beauty and The Beast Soundtrack

Regina Belle
Alladin Soundtrack

Joey McIntyre
Stay The Same

Lara Fabian
Lara Fabian

Savage Garden
Affirmation

Richard Elliot
Best Of Richard Elliot

Trey Lorenz
Trey Lorenz

Brie Larson
Finally Out Of PE

PYT
Center Stage Soundtrack

Kirk Whalum
Best Of Smooth Jazz 4

Fourplay
Best Of Fourplay

References 

Record producers from Illinois
Living people
People from Chicago
Year of birth missing (living people)